The La Pointe Light is a lighthouse located on Long Island, one of the Apostle Islands, in Lake Superior in Ashland County, Wisconsin, near the city of Bayfield.

Currently owned by the National Park Service and part of the Apostle Islands National Lakeshore, it was added to the National Register of Historic Places in 1983, as reference number 83003366. Listed in the Library of Congress, Historic American Buildings Survey, WI-325 and WI-325-A. One of the oldest skeletal lighthouses on the Great Lakes, it played an important role in transportation on Lake Superior.

The previous lens was moved to the Chequamegon Point Lighthouse in 1897. It is one of the Apostle Islands Lighthouses.

Getting there
Most of the Apostle Islands light stations may be reached on the Apostle Islands Cruise Service water taxi or by private boat during the summer. During the Annual Apostle Island Lighthouse Celebration ferry tour service is available for all the lighthouses. In the tourist season, volunteer park rangers are on many of the islands to greet visitors.

References

Further reading

 Havighurst, Walter (1943) The Long Ships Passing: The Story of the Great Lakes, Macmillan Publishers.
Jalbert, Andrew J. Schooner Lucerne: Lessons from a Great Lakes Shipwreck (July 27, 2007) originally printed in Sea History magazine, The Wreck of the Schooner Lucerne.
 Oleszewski, Wes, Great Lakes Lighthouses, American and Canadian: A Comprehensive Directory/Guide to Great Lakes Lighthouses, (Gwinn, Michigan: Avery Color Studios, Inc., 1998) .
 
 Wright, Larry and Wright, Patricia, Great Lakes Lighthouses Encyclopedia Hardback (Erin: Boston Mills Press, 2006) .

External links
Aerial photos of La Pointe Light, Marina.com.
Library of Congress Historic American Buildings Survey Survey number HABS WI-325
Library of Congress Historic American Buildings Survey Survey number HABS WI-325-A
Lighthouse Friends, La Pointe Light article
National Park Service Maritime History Project, Inventory of Historic Light Stations - Wisconsin, La Pointe Light.
Terry Pepper, Seeing the Light, New La Pointe Light Station.
Terry Pepper, Seeing the Light, Old La Pointe Light Station.

Wobser, David, La Pointe Light, Boatnerd Originally in Great Laker Magazine.

Lighthouses completed in 1896
Lighthouses in Ashland County, Wisconsin
Lighthouses on the National Register of Historic Places in Wisconsin
National Register of Historic Places in Ashland County, Wisconsin
National Register of Historic Places in Apostle Islands National Lakeshore